MI-5 may refer to:

 MI5, the domestic security service of the United Kingdom
 MI-5, a television series broadcast in some countries under this name rather than its original title Spooks
 MI-5, a 2015 British film based on the series, released as Spooks: The Greater Good in some countries
 Michigan's 5th congressional district
 M-5 (Michigan highway), in the U.S. state of Michigan
 Mission: Impossible – Rogue Nation, a 2015 action film known in shorthand as M:I-5
 CKMI-DT, a television station known as "MI 5" when it was based in Quebec City
 Tales of Monkey Island (also known as Monkey Island 5), videogame

See also
 Mil V-5, a helicopter project that never reached production
MIV (disambiguation)